Johannes Hendrik "Spanner" Pretorius (born 22 October 1987) is a South African rugby union player, who most recently played for . His regular position is loose-forward.

Career
He made his first class debut for them in the 2011 Vodacom Cup game against  and quickly established himself as a regular starter.

He then joined the Border Bulldogs for the start of the 2013 Vodacom Cup competition.

References

South African rugby union players
Living people
1987 births
Leopards (rugby union) players
Border Bulldogs players
People from Klerksdorp
Rugby union flankers
Rugby union players from North West (South African province)